Choir Olympics 2000 was the first international music event of the World Choir Games, an international choir competition organized by the Interkultur foundation. The competition took place in Linz, Austria, with the participation of 60 countries.

Contest 

The first choir Olympiad took place on July 7–16, 2000. More than 15,000 choral singers from several countries gathered in Linz, Austria to launch the premiere of the First Choral Olympiad. The competition was organized from a total of 403 competitions in 28 categories. At the end of the competition, the international jury and consisted of a group of 51 people, presented 69 gold, 124 silver and 34 bronze medals to their owners.

Winners 
According to the final results of the first Choir Olympics, the list of the five strongest winners by the number of gold medals is presented in the following table:

References 

Biennial events
Choral festivals
Recurring events established in 2000
Singing competitions